Nong Ruea is a district (amphoe) of Khon Kaen province, northeastern Thailand.

History
The minor district (king amphoe) Nong Ruea was established in 1959 by splitting it from Mueang Khon Kaen district. On 31 January 1963 it was upgraded to a full district.

Geography
Neighboring districts are (from the west clockwise): Chum Phae, Phu Wiang, Ubolratana, Ban Fang, and Mancha Khiri of Khon Kaen Province, and Ban Thaen of Chaiyaphum province.

Administration
The district is divided into 10 subdistricts (tambons), which are further subdivided into 149 villages (mubans). There are three townships (thesaban tambons): Nong Ruea covers parts of tambons Nong Ruea and Nong Kae, parts of tambons Kut Kwang, Non Sa-at, and Dom Mong, and parts of Bang Kong and Chorakhe. There are a further 10 tambon administrative organizations (TAO).

Economy
Two major factories can be found in the Nong Reua District: the Mitr Phu Viang sugar refinery, and the Khon Kaen Fishing Net Co. Ltd. factory.

References

External links
http://www.nongrueadoc.com District website (Thai)

Nong Ruea